RDX is an explosive.

RDX may also refer to:

Science and technology
 Radixin, a protein encoded by the RDX gene
 RDX register, a CPU register in 64-bit x86 processors
 RDX Technology, a data storage format

Other uses
 RDX (band), a reggae duo from Kingston, Jamaica
 Acura RDX, a 2006–present Japanese compact SUV